Gerard Casey may refer to:

 Gerard Casey (artist), Irish artist
 Gerard Casey (philosopher) (born 1951), member of the School of Philosophy, University College Dublin
 Gerard Casey (Irish republican) (died 1989), member of the Provisional Irish Republican Army

See also
 Casey (disambiguation)
 Gerard (disambiguation)